Comienza A Vivir is the seventh studio album released by Los Mismos on September 17, 2002.

Pedro Sanchez departed from the band and was replaced by Jorge Ortiz. Leaving Roberto Guadarrama as the final original member of Los Bukis.

Track listing

References

2002 albums
Spanish-language albums
Los Mismos albums